The Noorani family is a term used to refer to the immediate family of the Imām of the Nizari Ismāʿīli Shia Muslims, commonly known by the title of Aga Khan. By convention and custom its members and descendants in the male line are titled Prince and Princess, and as such it can be regarded as a royal family, although only the Aga Khan himself, as its head, is entitled to be referred to by the style of His Highness. The style of His Highness was formally granted to the Aga Khan IV by Queen Elizabeth II in 1957 upon the death of his grandfather Aga Khan III.

Members

His Highness  Prince Shah Karim Al-Hussaini, Aga Khan IV (born 1936)

Prince Irfan Aga Khan (born 2015)
Prince Sinan Aga Khan (born 2017)
Princess Zahra Aga Khan (born 1970)
Sara Boyden (born 2000)
Iliyan Boyden (born 2002)
Prince Hussain Aga Khan (born 1974) m. (2019) Princess Fareen Aga Khan (born 1975)
Prince Aly Muhammad Aga Khan (born 2000)
Descendants of Prince Aly Khan (father of Aga Khan IV) (1911-1960)
Prince Amyn Muhammad Aga Khan (born 1937)
Princess Yasmin Aga Khan (born 1949)

Recently deceased members
Descendants of Aga Khan III (1877-1957), m. (1944) Begum Om Habibeh Aga Khan, Mata Salamat (née Yvonne Blanche Labrousse, 1906–2000)
Giuseppe Mahdi Khan (died 1911)
Prince Aly Khan (father of Aga Khan IV) (1911-1960), Joan Yarde-Buller (m. 1936 div. 1949), Rita Hayworth (m. 1949 div. 1953) 
Prince Sadruddin Aga Khan (1933-2003) m. (1957, div. 1962) Princess Shirin Aga Khan (née Nina Dwyer), (1972) Princess Catherine Aleya Aga Khan (née Sursock, b. 1938)
Andrew Ali Aga Khan Embiricos - (1985-2011), son of Princess Yasmin Aga Khan

Living former members
Princess Salimah Aga Khan, born 1940, former wife of Aga Khan IV (m. 1969; div. 1995)
Princess Inaara Aga Khan, born 1963, former wife of Aga Khan IV (m. 1998; div. 2011)
Khaliya Aga Khan, born 1976, former wife of Prince Hussain Aga Khan (m. 2006⁠ –⁠ div. 2013)
Salwa Aga Khan, born 1988, former wife of Prince Rahim Aga Khan (m. 2013)

References

Notes